Expansion Records is a British record label founded by Northern Soul DJ Richard Searling and Soul Bowl owner John Anderson.  In 1989, DJ Author & Journalist Ralph Tee joined the label, both he and Searling run Expansion Records.

Label history

In 1986, Expansion released its first twelve-inch record with the catalogue ref: EXPAND1 (in 1986) - "Love Me Anyway" by US band WQBC (via a distribution deal with PRT).

In 2004, Graphic Designer & DJ Simon Strutt rebranded the Expansion Records identity and created the 'e' logo to brand stamp each music release.

In 2010, Expansion released EXPAND100 ("Weatherman" by Adriana Evans).

At various times in its 25-year history artists that have signed to Expansion have included Leon Ware, Stephanie Mills, Leroy Hutson, Angie Stone, Gwen McCrae, Howard Hewett, Keni Burke, Lenny Williams, Rick James, Ronnie McNeir, Evelyn ‘Champagne’ King, Maysa to name a few.

Current/former artists
Adriana Evans
 Dira
Frank McComb
Leon Ware
Maysa Leak
Stephanie Mills
Keni Burke
Lenny Williams
Helen Baylor
Cool Million
Angie Stone
Howard Hewett
Jean Carne
Ronnie McNeir
Leroy Hutson
Trina Broussard
Evelyn 'Champagne' King
Rick James
Peggi Blu
Jabari Grover
Kim Tibbs
Noel Elmowy
  Brit Funk Association

12" Discography

EXPAND 1         WQBC: Love Me Anyway
EXPAND 2         ANDREW BARRAX: Just Can't Seem To Forget
EXPAND 3         LEO’S SUNSHIPP: Give Me The Sunshine
EXPAND 4         CHAS: For Your Love
EXPAND 5         CLARENCE MANN         I'll Be Around
EXPAND 6         RONNIE McNEIR: Follow Your Heart
EXPAND 7         GENERAL CROOK: Mainsqueeze
EXPAND 8         JAMES KING: Memory
EXPAND 9         CURTIS REED: Exit 23
EXPAND 10         LESLIE DRAYTON: Dreamer
EXPAND 11         RONNIE MCNEIR: I'm So In Love With You Baby
EXPAND 12         JAMES KING: Storyteller
EXPAND 15         DUTCH ROBINSON: Low Down
EXPAND 16         SNOW         : Every Time You're Around
EXPAND 17         RONNIE McNEIR: Searching
EXPAND 18         GLAZE: Promises
EXPAND 19         HELEN BAYLOR: There's No Greater Love
EXPAND 20         HELEN BAYLOR: Oasis         
EXPAND 21         LEON WARE: Shoulda Been You         
EXPAND 22         AJA: Shine         
EXPAND 23         CALVIN BROOKS: My Favourite Thing         
EXPAND 24         LEROY HUTSON: Share Your Love         
EXPAND 25         CORNELL BROWN: 5 Minutes Of Love Talk                  
EXPAND 26         HELEN BAYLOR: Victory                  
EXPAND 27         BILLY & SARAH GAINES: I Found Someone                  
EXPAND 28         JOSIE JAMES: Win Your Love                  
EXPAND 29         MATT COVINGTON: We Got One                  
EXPAND 30         VERNESSA MITCHEL: Be For Real                  
EXPAND 31         SOUL SAUCE SAMPLER                  
EXPAND 32         JOSIE JAMES: Morning Glow                  
EXPAND 33         CHRIS BALLIN: Stay Away From You                  
EXPAND 34         FRESH AIR: Miss You                  
EXPAND 35         LORENZO: Tic Toc                  
EXPAND 36         GWEN McCRAE: I Can Only Think of You                  
EXPAND 37         EL COCO: One Step Back For Love                  
EXPAND 38         GARY TAYLOR: A.P.B.                  
EXPAND 39         BILLY & SARAH GAINES: Love's The Key                  
EXPAND 40         VICTOR HAYNES: Caught Up                  
EXPAND 41         DENNIS AUSTIN: I'll Shine For You                  
EXPAND 42         RICK WEBB: Think About It                  
EXPAND 43         THE VALENTINE BROTHERS: This Kind of Love                  
EXPAND 44         BILLY VALENTINE: Ja Miss Me                  
EXPAND 45         SOUL SAUCE SAMPLER VOL.3                  
EXPAND 46         JAMARIAH: Beverly                  
EXPAND 47         INGRAM: My Sabrina Tequina                  
EXPAND 48         KYMIZTRE: Come Share Your Love                  
EXPAND 49         DAWKINS & DAWKINS: Miracle                  
EXPAND 50         JOUS: Another Lonely Night                  
EXPAND 51         VICTOR HAYNES: Don't Want Nobody Else                  
EXPAND 52         GARY TAYLOR: Restless                  
EXPAND 53         GARY: Rockin U Tonite                  
EXPAND 54         SOUL SAUCE SAMPLER VOL.4                  
EXPAND 55         HOWARD HEWETT: This Love Is Forever                  
EXPAND 56         TRINA PERRY: I Can't Get Enough                  
EXPAND 57         TERRY GARMON: Anyway                  
EXPAND 58         EVELYN ‘CHAMPAGNE’ KING: I Think About You                  
EXPAND 59         NICOLE JACKSON: I Like                  
EXPAND 60         SOUL SAUCE SAMPLER VOL.5                  
EXPAND 61         JIVE: Jive                  
EXPAND 62         VOICES IN CONTROL E.P                  
EXPAND 63         REBBIE JACKSON E.P.                  
EXPAND 64         SYLVIA STRIPLIN                  
EXPAND 65         RONDEY MANNSFIELD         Call Me         
EXPAND 66         KENI BURKE         I Need Your Love/Indigenous Love         
EXPAND 67         KASHIF: Good Ol’ Days/Bed You Down         
EXPAND 68         PHILLIPPE: Listen To Me         
EXPAND 69         PATTERSON TWINS: I Need Your Love
EXPAND 70         KUH LEDESMA: rReaming         
EXPAND 71         LEW KIRTON: Heaven In The Afternoon
EXPAND 72         HOLLOWAY: Everything You Do         
EXPAND 73         ROBBIE DANZIE         (Love) Undeniable         
EXPAND 74         ATLANTIC STARR: You         
EXPAND 75         GERRY DeVEAUX         Front Of The Line         
EXPAND 76         JIMMY COBB         So Nobody Else Can Hear         
EXPAND 77         LENNY WILLIAMS         Gotta Lotta Luv         
EXPAND 78         MAYSA LEAK         The Bottle         
EXPAND 79         WIZDOM I'm So In Love With You/DeBOUSE         Every Fellas Girl
EXPAND 80         ANDRE DE LANG         Could You Be My Favourite Girl         
EXPAND 81         MYSTIC MERLIN         Mr. Magician         
EXPAND 82         4 BELOW ZERO         My Baby's Got E.S.P.
EXPAND 83         RENE & ANGELA: Secret Rendezvous
EXPAND 84         SHEREE BROWN: It's A Pleasure
EXPAND 85         FREEDOM: Get Up & Dance
EXPAND 86         KLOUD 9: On Kloud 9 EP
EXPAND 87         MAYSA: Family Affair/The Bottle
EXPAND 88         KLOUD 9 EP
EXPAND 89         LONNIE HILL: Galveston Bay/Cold Winter In The Ghetto
EXPAND 90         CARMEN RODGERS: The Way/Dream
EXPAND 91         ALYSON WILLIAMS: Soft & Warm
EXPAND 92         STEPHANIE MILLS: Born For This EP
EXPAND 93         RICK JAMES Taste (Withdrawn)
EXPAND 94         EVERYDAY PEOPLE EP 
EXPAND 95          HOPE COLLECTIVE: Give And Let Live
EXPAND 96         STEPHANIE MILLS: Free (Master At Work remixes)
EXPAND 97         DIPLOMATS OF SOUL: Someday
EXPAND 98         MAYSA: Runnin’ (Original/Reel People Remixes)
EXPAND 99         KARL FRIERSON: Ten Minutes/Tall Green Grass
EXPAND 100       ADRIANA EVANS: Weatherman/Surrender

References

External links
 Expansion Records (Official Website)
 

British record labels